Burbridge is an Anglo-Saxon surname. Notable people with the surname include:

Aaron Burbridge (b. 1993), American football player
Betty Burbridge (1895–1987), American screenwriter and actress
Branse Burbridge (1921–2016), World War II RAF Pilot
Cynthia Carmen Burbridge (born 1979), Thai model, actress and author
Grace Burbridge (born 1887), British suffragette, burned whilst setting fire to a postbox
Kenneth Joseph Burbridge, Canadian diplomat
Kofi Burbridge (1961–2019), American musician
Lyle J. Burbridge (1922–2006), American sound engineer
Martin Burbridge, first Chief Scout of Scouting Ireland
Nick Burbridge (b. 1954), British author
Oteil Burbridge (born 1967), American bass guitarist
Paul Burbridge (b. 1932), Anglican clergyman
Stephen Gano Burbridge (1831–1894), American general

References

English-language surnames